The Monastery of Bonaval (Spanish: Monasterio de Bonaval) is a monastery located in Retiendas, Spain. It was declared Bien de Interés Cultural in 1992.

References 

Bien de Interés Cultural landmarks in the Province of Guadalajara
Monasteries in Castilla–La Mancha